Herdis Torvaldsdatter (ca. 1310–1363) was a Norwegian noblewoman and landowner.

Herdis Torvaldsdatter  was the daughter of Torvald Toresson (ca. 1265- ca. 1330) and his second wife Ragndid Jonsdatter (ca. 1295–1312), daughter of Jon Raud Ivarsson til Sudreim.  Torvald Toresson served as the Sysselmann in  Shetland and as such was the royal representative of the Kingdom of Norway.

Herdis Torvaldsdatter was widowed twice and accumulated property through both inheritance and marriage. She was perhaps the largest and most noted female landowner in Norway in her time.
At her death, the bulk of her estate was inherited by two of her cousins, Jon Havtoresson (ca. 1312–ca. 1390 and Sigurd Havtoresson (ca. 1315–ca. 1392) 
who were the sons of her uncle Havtore Jonsson (1275–1320) and his wife Agnes Haakonsdatter (1290–1319).

See also
Sudreim claim

References

1310 births
1363 deaths
14th-century Norwegian women
Norwegian landowners
14th-century women landowners
People associated with Shetland
14th-century Norwegian nobility